Platanthera tescamnis, the intermountain bog orchid or yellow rein orchid, is a species of orchid described in 2006. The plant is well-known but had been misidentified. It is native to the Great Basin and Colorado Plateau of the western United States (Colorado, Utah, Arizona, Nevada, California), where it grows in warmer, drier habitat than most related orchids.

The inflorescence is a dense spike of many small yellow-green flowers.

References

External links 
 
 
 P. tescamnis page (with live specimen photos) from Calflora
 Jepson Manual Treatment

tescamnis
Endemic orchids of the United States
Flora of the Great Basin
Plants described in 2006
Flora without expected TNC conservation status